
30th Fighter Division (30. Jagd Division) was one of the primary divisions of the German Luftwaffe in World War II. It was formed in September 1943 in Berlin and disbanded on 16 March 1944. The Division was subordinated to the Luftwaffenbefehlshaber Mitte (September 1943 – February 1944) and the I. Jagdkorps (February 1944 – March 1944).

Commanding officers
 Oberst Hajo Herrmann, September 1943 – 16 March 1944

Subordinated units
Jagdgeschwader 300
Jagdgeschwader 301
Jagdgeschwader 302

See also
Luftwaffe Organisation

References

Air divisions of the Wehrmacht Luftwaffe
Military units and formations established in 1943
Military units and formations disestablished in 1944